The Science of Desire: The Search for the Gay Gene and the Biology of Behavior is a 1994 book by the geneticist Dean Hamer and the journalist Peter Copeland, in which the authors discuss Hamer's research into the genetics of homosexuality.

The book received both positive and mixed reviews. It was praised as a well-written discussion of science that properly acknowledged the limitations of genetic research on homosexuality, usefully explored its ethical implications, and drew on a wide range of sources and publications. However, reviewers were unconvinced by Hamer's suggestions about the possible evolutionary basis of homosexuality, and argued that some of his claims were incorrect, that more work needed to be done to confirm or refute his genetic findings, and that his use of the term "gay gene" was misleading. Hamer's treatment of psychology and psychiatry was also criticized as biased.

Summary

Hamer argues that human sexuality can and should be studied scientifically and discusses his findings about Xq28, a region of the X chromosome. According to Hamer, he shifted his area of research from metallothionein to the genetics of homosexuality after reading the naturalist Charles Darwin's The Descent of Man, and Selection in Relation to Sex (1871) and the evolutionary geneticist Richard Lewontin, the neurobiologist Steven Rose and the psychologist Leon Kamin's Not in Our Genes (1984). Hamer writes that Darwin's book surprised him because of the amount of space it devotes to discussing sexual selection. He describes Lewontin et al.′s work as "a political rather than a scientific book" and expresses his disagreement with its politics. However, he comments that it taught him that the genetics of behavior is an emotionally and politically charged topic, especially where it concerns sexuality. He criticizes Alfred Kinsey, as well as Sigmund Freud and his views on homosexuality.

Publication history
The Science of Desire was first published in 1994 by Simon & Schuster.

Reception
The Science of Desire received positive reviews from Genevieve Stuttaford in Publishers Weekly, Constance Rinaldo in Library Journal, the science journalist Natalie Angier in The New York Times Book Review, Martin Johnson in New Scientist, the psychiatrist Susan Bradley in The New England Journal of Medicine, the science writer Jonathan Weiner in The New Republic, and the biologist Paul R. Gross in National Review. The book received mixed reviews from W. Lener in Choice, the journalist Richard Horton in The New York Review of Books, and the psychologist John C. Gonsiorek in the Journal of Sex Research. The book was also reviewed by the journalist Steven Petrow in The Advocate, Deborah Franklin in The Washington Post, the historian of science Daniel Kevles in The New Yorker, Nancy Ordover in Socialist Review, and by New York Native and Lambda Book Report, and discussed in The Lancet.

Stuttaford described the book as "admirably lucid and surprisingly lively". She credited Hamer with carefully pointing out the limitations of genetic research on sexual orientation, simplifying complex ideas for general readers, and exploring the ethical implications of a "gay gene" with "laudable compassion and common sense." Rinaldo described the book as an engaging and personalized account of scientific investigation, and recommended it for both lay readers and specialists. Angier described the book as  "a surprising delight to read", writing that Hamer did not overstate his case for the innateness of sexual orientation and "has the welcome habit of sticking to the facts." However, she wrote that the last sections, in which Hamer discussed "still-floundering searches for the genes behind alcoholism, manic depression, shyness, aggression and the like" were less satisfactory.

Johnson believed that Hamer's work made clear the difficulties involved in studying sexuality. He considered its title misleading, as no "gay gene" has been "proven or identified", and criticized Hamer for confusing "sexuality and sex" and for implying that "AIDS (rather than HIV) is sexually transmitted". He also questioned why Hamer needed a co-author, and why a scientist as busy as Hamer claimed to be would find writing a book "describing the background to a single, as yet unconfirmed, unextended and far from concluded, study" a high priority. However, the book convinced him that "the more cynical answers to this question" were mistaken. He found the book well-written, writing that it "conveys something of the serendipity of scientific advance", gave insightful descriptions of scientists, and outlined "the problems of determining whether there are genetic bases for complex behaviours" and suggested a way of overcoming them that made clear that this methodology relies on "redefining a complex characteristic in very limited terms". He concluded that it was "probably the best attempt at a genetic analysis of human sexuality that we have so far, which indicates just how far we have to go" and predicted that it would "fuel the moral debate about what any genetic component to sexuality might mean for ethics and the law." He wrote that Hamer should be "congratulated and encouraged" for contributing to the debate.

Bradley described the book as a well-written account of the process of science. She commented that more work needed to be done to replicate Hamer's research and identify the relevant gene, but credited Hamer with being "cautious in extrapolating his findings to larger issues" and acknowledging the limitations of the research. However, she wrote that despite his caution, Hamer used the term "gay gene" in a misleading fashion, since "the term implies more than Hamer's work establishes." She also commented that, "the least well thought out and presented part of this book is the section on psychological theories", which she considered understandable given that Hamer is "not trained in psychology or psychiatry". In her view, "even its subtitle, “Sissies, Freud, and Sex Acts,” suggests a hasty dismissal of the importance of psychological theories." She concluded that the book, "makes enjoyable reading, particularly for anyone interested in the making of science as it relates to human behavior or sexuality."

Weiner described the book as a calm and modestly written account of Hamer's research. He credited Hamer with avoiding over-stating the importance of his work or sensationalizing his results, writing that he had produced a "clear and capable book about a difficult subject." Gross wrote that the book deserved to be widely read. Lener wrote that parts of the book were "diary-like", and gave Hamer's "descriptions of methods used" and "life histories of gay men who participated in the study" as examples. He also wrote that some of Hamer's statements, such as that nobody has studied the number of gay men in the United States since Kinsey's research, were incorrect, but nevertheless considered the book generally "very accurate" and credited Hamer with drawing on "recent, important publications." He concluded that, "General readers as well as professionals and practitioners in sex education/therapy will find much of interest and value."

Gonsiorek considered the book a competent and engaging discussion of Hamer's scientific work, but one that showed the "tension and unease" inherent in popularizing science. He questioned Hamer's description of how he shifted "from an obscure to a high-profile area of genetics", writing that it strained credibility. He called Hamer's discussion of the development of his research protocol "gossipy" and wrote that it contained "many tidbits, some less than kind, and many less than relevant" about the people involved. He praised Hamer's "ability to synthesize information from diverse sources and apply it creatively", his discussions of possible biological mechanisms for the heritability of male homosexuality and the public policy implications of his scientific research, and his criticism of social constructionism. However, he found Hamer's attempt to synthesize his ideas with "psychological concepts" unsuccessful and his evolutionary ideas intriguing but insufficiently developed. He wrote that Hamer tried to connect his ideas to "issues from handedness to Alzheimer's, usually coming off sounding like he has not sufficiently mastered the specific areas", and failed in his discussion of the "behavioral and social science literature", for example by mistakenly identifying social constructionism as a form of behaviorism. He also considered the book as a whole "marred" by Hamer's persistent hostility towards psychiatry.

Horton described the book as a "popular account" of Hamer's research and credited Hamer, along with other researchers, with helping to make a "forceful but by no means definitive case for the view that biological and genetic influences have an important--perhaps even decisive--part in determining sexual preference among males." Though noting that Hamer acknowledged the limitations of his research, he criticized Hamer for having an unsubtle view of the meaning of "biological influence" on sexual orientation that ignores the question of how genes produce an "unpredictable interplay of behavioral impulses", and engaging in "overstretched speculations" about "why a gene for homosexuality still exists when it apparently has little apparent survival value in evolutionary terms." He concluded that while Hamer's work "presents technical and conceptual difficulties" and his "preliminary findings obviously need replication or refutation" it "represents a genuine epistemological break away from the past's rigid and withered conceptions of sexual preference."

The Lancet endorsed Hamer's proposal for "the creation of a US centre--a National Institute for Sexual Health--to coordinate federal funding for research into sexuality", agreeing with Hamer that "the place of sexuality in human life" is "sufficiently important to merit specific and rigorous scientific study."

The Science of Desire was criticized by the philosopher Timothy F. Murphy and the gay activist Dennis Altman. Murphy noted that while Hamer's research, if valid, establishes evidence of a generic influence on sexual orientation, the nature of that influence remains to be specified. He noted that Hamer's research, like similar studies, has been criticized on the grounds of its small sample size, as well as on other grounds specific to it, and that other researchers have reported difficulty in replicating Hamer's findings. He concluded that much more work had to be done before it could be accepted that genes at Xq28 determine the sexual orientation of some males, despite Hamer's conducting a follow-up study. Murphy argued that while Hamer believed that the study of animal sexual behavior will help make society more tolerant of homosexuality, it was uncertain that it would and if it did, this "should not be because descriptions of the behavior of animals have normative force in regard to the behavior of human beings." Altman described Hamer's suggestion that homosexuality has a genetic basis as dubious. He noted that it conflicted with "the theories and discoveries of both Freud and Kinsey".

See also
 Biology and sexual orientation
 Environment and sexual orientation
 Gay Science

References

Bibliography
Books

 
 
 

Journals

External links
The Science of Desire on Google Books

1994 non-fiction books
American non-fiction books
English-language books
Non-fiction books about same-sex sexuality
Popular science books
Simon & Schuster books